The 100 greatest Brazilian music records list was chosen by voting held by the Rolling Stone Brasil magazine published in October 2007.

Election 
The choice of the "100 greatest" was based on the sum of votes of 60 scholars, producers and Brazilian music journalists. Each of the voters chose 20 albums, in no order of preference, which according to Rolling Stone, should be based on criteria like "intrinsical artistic value and historical importance, that is, how much the album influenced other artists."

The list

Statistics 
Among the top 10, three albums were released in 1972, including the most voted Acabou Chorare, by the group  Novos Baianos. Of the 25 best records, 14 were released in the 1970 decade. The artists with more than one record in the list are:
 Caetano Veloso, Gilberto Gil (7)
 Gal Costa, Jorge Ben, Os Mutantes, Tom Jobim (5)
 João Gilberto, Roberto Carlos, Tim Maia (4)
 Elis Regina (3)
 Cartola, Chico Buarque, Chico Science & Nação Zumbi, Dorival Caymmi, Ira!, João Donato, Los Hermanos, Legião Urbana, Nara Leão, Maria Bethânia, Marisa Monte, Milton Nascimento, Mundo Livre S/A, Paulinho da Viola, Racionais MC's, Raul Seixas, Sepultura, Titãs, Tom Zé (2)

See also
[[Rolling Stone Argentina's The 100 Greatest Albums of National Rock|Rolling Stone Argentina'''s The 100 Greatest Albums of National Rock]], a similar list from the Argentine edition of Rolling Stone'' which was also released in 2007.

External links 
 Página oficial da Rolling Stone Brasil
 Lista no site da revista

Rolling Stone articles
Lists of albums
Brazilian music